Mikko Koskinen (born 18 July 1988) is a Finnish professional ice hockey goaltender for HC Lugano of the National League (NL). Koskinen was drafted in the second round, 31st overall, in the 2009 NHL Entry Draft by the New York Islanders.

Playing career

Koskinen was drafted 31st overall by the New York Islanders in the 2009 NHL Entry Draft after playing for the Espoo Blues in the Finnish SM-liiga. He was the first goalie and first Finnish player selected that year. Prior to the draft, he was the second-ranked European goaltender by NHL Central Scouting Bureau.

On 13 July 2009, Koskinen signed a three-year entry-level contract with the New York Islanders. In the 2009–10 season, his first in North America, Koskinen was assigned to the Islanders affiliate, the Bridgeport Sound Tigers, to start the year. After only two appearances with the Sound Tigers, he suffered a torn labrum in his hip which required surgery and ruled him out for the majority of the season. On 19 March 2010, after four months of rehab, Koskinen was reassigned to the secondary Islanders affiliate, the Utah Grizzlies, for the remainder of the year. Undefeated in six starts, he helped the Grizzlies reach the conference semi-finals before returning to the Sound Tigers' first-round playoff series on 18 April 2010.

Koskinen made his National Hockey League (NHL) debut on 8 February 2011 against the Toronto Maple Leafs as the Islanders lost 5–3. He earned his first career NHL win two days later in a 4–3 shootout victory over the Montreal Canadiens.

On 12 November 2011, Koskinen returned to Finland, signing with KalPa.

In April 2013, Koskinen signed with the Espoo Blues.

In September 2013, Koskinen left Finland to play for Sibir Novosibirsk in the Kontinental Hockey League (KHL). Part way through the 2014–15 season he was traded to SKA Saint Petersburg for fellow goaltender Alexander Salák. Koskinen and his team went on to win the Gagarin Cup, the KHL championship trophy in April 2015 and 2017.

On 1 May 2018, Koskinen agreed to terms on a one year, $2.5 million contract with the Edmonton Oilers of the NHL. On 21 January 2019, the Oilers signed Koskinen to a three-year, $13.5 million extension. The decision to sign Koskinen for three years based on such a short tenure was considered unusual, and many speculated that it was a cause of the dismissal of controversial Oilers general manager Peter Chiarelli days later.

After the end of the 2021–22 NHL season and the end of his contract with the Oilers, Koskinen signed a two-year contract with HC Lugano of the Swiss National League (NL) on 13 June 2022.

International play

Koskinen has represented Finland in the World Championships in 2014 and 2016. In 2016, he was included in the All-Star Team and was named the best goaltender.

Career statistics

Regular season and playoffs

International

Awards

International

KHL

References

External links
 

1988 births
Living people
Bridgeport Sound Tigers players
Edmonton Oilers players
Espoo Blues players
Finnish expatriate ice hockey players in Canada
Finnish expatriate ice hockey players in the United States
Finnish ice hockey goaltenders
KalPa players
Kiekko-Vantaa players
HC Lugano players
New York Islanders draft picks
New York Islanders players
Ice hockey players at the 2018 Winter Olympics
Olympic ice hockey players of Finland
Sportspeople from Vantaa
HC Sibir Novosibirsk players
SKA Saint Petersburg players
Utah Grizzlies (ECHL) players